The Zârna is a left tributary of the Râul Doamnei in Romania. Its source is the Zârna Lake in the Făgăraș Mountains.

References

Rivers of Romania
Rivers of Argeș County